Munira Khalil is an American chemist who is the Leon C. Johnson Professor of Chemistry and Department Chair at the University of Washington.

Early life and education 

Khalil attended Colgate University, where she majored in chemistry and English and was a member of Phi Beta Kappa. She moved to the Massachusetts Institute of Technology for doctoral research, where she developed coherent two-dimensional infrared spectroscopy to study the molecular structure of coupled vibrations on a picosecond timescale. Khalil moved to the University of California, Berkeley as a postdoctoral researcher, where she was made a Miller Fellow.

Research and career 
In 2007, Khalili joined the University of Washington. Her research makes use of ultrafast spectroscopies to understand the structural dynamics of molecules. Photoinduced charge transfer depends on an interplay between atomic and electronic processes on multi-dimensional energy surfaces. She develops 3D electronic-vibrational femtosecond spectroscopies to understand vibrational and electronics motions on femtosecond timescales. In particular, she is interested in how solvents (e.g. water in photosynthesis) impact the electron transfer processes.

Khalil was made Chair of the Department of Chemistry in 2020.

Awards and honors 
 2007 Dreyfus New Faculty Award
 2008 Packard Fellowship in Science and Engineering
 2009 National Science Foundation CAREER Award
 2011 Chinese-American Kavli Frontiers of Science symposium
 2012 Sloan Research Fellowship
 2013 Camille-Dreyfus Teacher-Scholar Award 
 2014 Journal of Physical Chemistry Lectureship
 2011 Kavli Frontiers of Science Fellow
 2017 American Physical Society Fellow
 2021 Elected to the Washington State Academy of Sciences
 2022 Joe W. and Dorothy Dorsett Brown Foundation Brown Investigator Awards

Selected publications

References 

Living people
University of Washington faculty
21st-century American chemists
Colgate University alumni
Massachusetts Institute of Technology people
University of California, Berkeley people
Fellows of the American Physical Society
Sloan Research Fellows
Spectroscopists
American women chemists
Year of birth missing (living people)
21st-century American women scientists